William McClintock can refer to:

 William McClintock-Bunbury (1800–1866), Irish naval commander and politician
 William McClintock (English cricketer) (1896–1946), English cricketer
 William McClintock (Irish cricketer) (born 1997), Irish cricketer
 William C. McClintock, American newspaper editor and publisher